Myopites orientalis is a species of tephritid or fruit flies in the genus Myopites of the family Tephritidae.

Distribution
Russia.

References

Tephritinae
Insects described in 1987
Diptera of Asia